Uijeongbu or Uijŏngbu can refer to:

Uijeongbu City, in north party of the South Korean Gyeonggi province.
the State Council of Joseon, known in Korean as the ui jeong bu
Uijeongbu Station